Ernst Thälmann (16 April 1886 – 18 August 1944) was the leader of the Communist Party of Germany during much of the Weimar Republic.

For uses of his name, see:

 Ernst Thälmann (film), 1954
 Ernst Thälmann Pioneer Organisation
 Ernst Thälmann Pioneer Organisation session
 Ernst Thälmann Island
 Ernst-Thälmann-Park
 Sportforum Chemnitz (known as the Ernst-Thälmann-Stadion from 1945-92)
 SS Heidberg (sometimes referred to as the SS Ernst Thaelmann)

Thalmann, Ernst